The Jennings Randolph Bridge, built in 1977, is the largest Pratt truss bridge in North America. It spans  over the Ohio River between Chester, West Virginia and East Liverpool, Ohio. The bridge is located on U.S. Route 30 and is named after U.S. Senator Jennings Randolph (D-WV).  It replaced the 1897 Chester Bridge.

References

 List of crossings of the Ohio River

Road bridges in West Virginia
Bridges over the Ohio River
Buildings and structures in Hancock County, West Virginia
Transportation in Hancock County, West Virginia
Buildings and structures in Columbiana County, Ohio
Transportation in Columbiana County, Ohio
Road bridges in Ohio
U.S. Route 30
Bridges of the United States Numbered Highway System
Pratt truss bridges in the United States
Metal bridges in the United States
1977 establishments in Ohio
1977 establishments in West Virginia
Bridges completed in 1977